This is a list of people from the Democratic Republic of the Congo.

Artists 

 Moseka Yogo Ambake (1956–2019), painter
 Kiripi Katembo (1979–2015), photographer, documentary filmmaker and painter
 Gosette Lubondo (born 1993), photographer
 Albert Mongita (1916–1985), actor, dramatist, painter, filmmaker and theatre director
 Chéri Samba (born 1956), painter
 Pamela Tulizo (born 1994), photographer

Athletes
 Eshele Botende, retired football goalkeeper, played for Kaizer Chiefs and Maritimo
 Muteba Kidiaba, football goalkeeper playing for club TP Mazembe and the national team
 Jonathan Kuminga professional basketball player for Golden State Warriors
 Siadabida Manda, footballer, played for a number of clubs in Greece. Congo, Kinshasa 
 Emmanuel Mudiay, professional basketball player, NBA Denver Nuggets, New York Knicks, and Utah Jazz. Congo, Kinshasa
 Andy Mulumba, professional American football player Green Bay Packers. Congo, Kinshasa 
 Dikembe Mutombo, former basketball player who played for several teams in NBA
 Steve Zakuani, association football player, currently playing for Seattle Sounders FC in The MLS

Musicians
 Ferré Gola
 Fally Ipupa
 Le Grand Kallé
 Koffi Olomide
 Maître Gims
 Naza
 Fabregas
 Barbara Kanam
 Yxng Bane
 Keblack
 Awilo Longomba
 Papa Wemba
 Zaïko Langa Langa
 Damso

Politicians
 Mobutu Sese Seko
 Laurent-Désiré Kabila
 Joseph Kabila
 Félix Tshisekedi
 Jean-Pierre Bemba
 Pierre Marini Bodho
 Antoine Gizenga
 Patrice Lumumba
 Alphonse Maindo, political scientist

Activists 

 Marie Claire Kaberamanzi

Other
Alphonsine Cheusi (born 1955), Constitutional Court judge

See also
 List of Democratic Republic of the Congo writers
 Lists of people by nationality

References